The Official Service of Diffusion, Representations and Entertainment (styled Sodre) is a national cultural organization in Uruguay, controlled by the Ministry of Education and Culture.

It was formerly the national broadcaster of Uruguay prior to the separation of Radiodifusión Nacional del Uruguay as a distinct agency in 2015.

See also
 CX 6 SODRE
 CX 26 SODRE
 CX 38 SODRE

References

 
Government-owned companies of Uruguay
1929 establishments in Uruguay
Radio stations established in 1929
Government agencies established in 1929
Organizations based in Montevideo